Zodarion abantense is a species of ant spider found in mainland Portugal and the Azores islands.

See also
 List of Zodariidae species

References

External links

atlanticum
Arthropods of the Azores
Spiders of Europe
Spiders described in 2005